Caelostomus ghesquierei is a species of ground beetle in the subfamily Pterostichinae. It was described by Burgeon in 1935.

References

Caelostomus
Beetles described in 1935